The 1986 Hockey East Men's Ice Hockey Tournament was the 2nd Tournament in the history of the conference. It was played between March 7 and March 15, 1986. Quarterfinal games were played at home team campus sites, while the final four games were, for the first time, played at the Providence Civic Center in Providence, Rhode Island. This was the final year the Hockey East championship was decided at a venue outside of the state of Massachusetts (as of 2014). By winning the tournament, Boston University received the Hockey East's automatic bid to the 1986 NCAA Division I Men's Ice Hockey Tournament.

Format
The tournament featured three rounds of play. In the quarterfinals, the second seed and seventh seed, the third seed and sixth seeds, and the fourth seed and fifth seeds played a two-game series where the team that scored the most total goals was declared the winner and advanced to the semifinals. In the semifinals, the first seed was matched against the lowest remaining quarterfinalist while the other remaining quarterfinalists met in a single-elimination game with the winners advancing to the championship game and the losers meeting in a third-place game. The tournament champion receives an automatic bid to the 1986 NCAA Division I Men's Ice Hockey Tournament.

Conference standings
Note: GP = Games played; W = Wins; L = Losses; T = Ties; PTS = Points; GF = Goals For; GA = Goals Against

Bracket

Teams are reseeded after the quarterfinals

Note: * denotes overtime period(s)

Quarterfinals

(2) Boston University vs. (7) New Hampshire

(3) Northeastern vs. (6) Lowell

(4) Providence vs. (5) Maine

Semifinals

(1) Boston College vs. (6) Lowell

(2) Boston University vs. (4) Providence

Consolation

(4) Providence vs. (6) Lowell

Championship

(1) Boston College vs. (2) Boston University

Tournament awards

All-Tournament Team
F Ken Hodge (Boston College)
F Peter Marshall* (Boston University)
F Jeff Sveen (Boston University)
D David Quinn (Boston University)
D Scott Shaunessy (Boston University)
G Terry Taillefer (Boston University)
* Tournament MVP(s)

References

External links
Hockey East Online

Hockey East Men's Ice Hockey Tournament
HE tournament